The second and final series of Special Agent Oso premiered on  on Playhouse Disney and its series finale aired  on Disney Junior.

Episodes
Note: The italic text indicates that the characters are absent from both a and b. Special Agent Oso, Paw Pilot, and Mr. Dos were present in all episodes. The number with the parenthesis on step 3 indicates the number of seconds to complete the step.
{| class="wikitable sortable" style="width: 100%;"
|-
! width="8%" | Episode number
! width="8%" | Series episode number
! width="44%" | Title
! width="12%" | UKAir Date
! width="12%" | USAAir Date
! width="12%" | ProductionCode
|-

 
 

 

|}

References

2010 American television seasons
2011 American television seasons
2012 American television seasons